Lea Rühter (born 12 February 1998) is a German handball player for Buxtehuder SV in the Frauen Handball-Bundesliga and the German national team.

Rühter also represented the German junior national team, where she participated at the 2018 Women's Junior World Handball Championship, placing 13th and the 2017 Women's U-19 European Handball Championship.

In the 2017–18 season, she signed a 1-year contract on loan with HL Buchholz 08-Rosengarten.

She made her debut on the German national team on 28 September 2018, against Russia.

Achievements
Bundesliga:
Silver: 2015
Bronze: 2014, 2022
DHB-Pokal:
Winner: 2015, 2017

References

External links

1998 births
Living people
German female handball players
People from Hamburg
Sportspeople from Hamburg